Phylip Brydydd (fl. c. 1200–25) was a Welsh language court poet.

Phylip was poet to the court of Rhys Gryg, the Welsh prince who ruled part of the kingdom of Deheubarth.

Y Prydydd Bychan, who may have been his son, was also a court poet of Deheubarth.

References

Welsh-language poets
13th-century Welsh poets
Year of birth unknown
Year of death unknown